Anes Mravac (born 17 July 1989) is a Swedish former footballer of Bosnian descent.

External links
 

1989 births
Living people
Swedish footballers
Sweden youth international footballers
Swedish people of Bosnia and Herzegovina descent
Malmö FF players
IF Limhamn Bunkeflo (men) players
IFK Malmö Fotboll players
Trelleborgs FF players
Association football defenders
Footballers from Malmö